Knowles Shaw (October 13, 1834 – June 7, 1878) was an American author and composer of gospel hymns.

Biography
Shaw was born in Butler County in southwestern Ohio. His family moved to Rushville, Indiana when he was just a few weeks old. He was a member of the churches of Christ, also known as the Christian Church or Disciples of Christ at the time. 

His best known work is the popular gospel song "Bringing in the Sheaves" (words). He also wrote "Tarry with Me" and a tune used with "We Saw Thee Not" among many other works.

Shaw was a prolific evangelist, known for his wit, knowledge of the Bible, and ability to generate and maintain rapport with an audience. He baptized over eleven thousand people in his ministry.

Death

Shaw died in a train wreck in McKinney, Texas, and a Methodist minister on board said that Shaw saved his life in the wreck. He was buried in East Hill Cemetery in Rushville, Indiana. His last words were: "It is a grand thing to rally people to the Cross of Christ."

Shaw’s works

 Shining Pearls, 1868
 The Golden Gate, 1871
 Sparkling Jewels, 1871
 The Gospel Trumpet, 1878
 The Morning Star, 1878

Lyrics

 "Bringing in the Sheaves"
 "The Handwriting on the Wall"

Tunes
 "We Saw Thee Not"
 "I am the Vine and Ye are the Branches"
 "Tarry with Me"

References

External links

1834 births
1878 deaths
Railway accident deaths in the United States
Accidental deaths in Texas
American Disciples of Christ
Christian hymnwriters
19th-century American musicians
American hymnwriters